Kapıaçmaz is a quarter of the town Kovancılar of Elazığ Province in Turkey. Its population is 752 (2021). The village is populated by Kurds.

References

Kovancılar District
Kurdish settlements in Elazığ Province